Artjärvi is a former municipality of Finland. It was consolidated with the town of Orimattila on January 1, 2011.

The municipality was located in the Päijänne Tavastia region.

The municipality was unilingually Finnish.

History 
The name Artjärvi originally only referred to a nearby lake. In the 15th century, Artjärvi was the center of a taxation division, when it was also known as Sääksjärvi. Artjärvi, at the time a part of the Lapinjärvi parish, became the center of a chapel community in 1636. It became independent in 1865.

Artjärvi was consolidated with Orimattila in 2011.

References

External links

Municipality of Artjärvi – Official website 

Orimattila
Former municipalities of Finland
Populated places established in 1865
Populated places disestablished in 2011